The St. Louis Aces were a professional tennis team in the city of St. Louis, Missouri.  They entered the World TeamTennis League in 1994, and won their only WTT Championship title two years later.  The Aces played their home matches at the Dwight Davis Tennis Center in Forest Park.  The Aces played eighteen seasons in WTT before the franchise folded after the 2011 season.

Final squad
 Rick Leach, Head Coach
 Anna Kournikova
 Lindsay Davenport
 Tripp Phillips
 Līga Dekmeijere
 Andrei Pavel

References

External links

Sports clubs established in 1994
Aces
Defunct World TeamTennis teams
Tennis teams in Missouri
1994 establishments in Missouri
Sports clubs disestablished in 2011
2011 disestablishments in Missouri